The Honda Sonic is a 125 cc, later 150 cc underbone motorcycle designed for the Southeast Asian market by Honda. It is the part of the Nova series of sports oriented underbone motorbikes produced since the mid-1990s.

Engine 

The Sonic is fitted with the European CBR125R and Indonesian CS1 4-stroke engine. It was adapted to liquid cooling due to hotter weather conditions. The single-cylinder engine redlines at 10,900 rpm.

The engine utilizes an overbore design with two bigger valves. It also has a bigger Keihin carburetor with 28 mm venturi diameter.

Models 
The Sonic comes in two models, RS and RS Super.

Sonic 150R 

The Sonic 150R was launched in August 2015 in Indonesia. It is powered by a 150 cc liquid-cooled, DOHC, 4-valve, single-cylinder engine mated to a 6-speed constant mesh transmission. The Sonic 150R is built at Honda's Karawang plant, West Java, Indonesia. In the Philippines, the bike is named RS150 (not to be confused with the RS150R sold in Malaysia, as it is a rebadged Winner that sold in Vietnam).

Sonic